Ovayok Territorial Park (sometimes Uvajuq, formerly Mount Pelly) is a park situated  east of Cambridge Bay, in the Kitikmeot Region, Nunavut, Canada. The park can be accessed by vehicle from the community as a gravel road runs directly to it.

The park has a wide variety of wildlife with muskox being predominant; there are also barren-ground caribou, Arctic hare, Arctic fox, and North American brown lemmings. There are several lakes within the park and most contain Arctic char and lake trout. Birds include Arctic terns, ptarmigan, Canada geese, snowy owls and the common raven.

There are several archaeological sites within the park and these include tent rings and food caches. Thule and Paleo-Eskimo camp sites and artifacts has also been found nearby, suggesting that the area has been in use for at least a 1,000 years.

Behind this are two more eskers called Inuuhuktu (Baby Pelly) and Amaaqtuq (Lady Pelly).

Inuit legend says that the three hills are a family of starving giants. They were crossing Victoria Island looking for food and the father, Uvayuq, died first. Next the son, Inuuhuktu (English; "teenaged boy"), died and was followed by the mother, Amaaqtuq (English; "packing baby", see amauti), who was carrying her baby.

See also
List of Nunavut parks

References

Nunavut Handbook - Joe Otokiak
Cambridge Bay Elders

Further reading

 Pelly, David F., Elsie Anaginak Klengenberg, and Kim Crockatt. Uvajuq The Origin of Death. Cambridge Bay, Nunavut: Kitikmeot Heritage Society, 1999.

External links

Nunavut Parks - Ovayok
Ovayok Territorial Park at Travel Nunavut

Parks in Kitikmeot Region
Archaeological sites in Nunavut
Prehistory of the Arctic
Former populated places in the Kitikmeot Region
Year of establishment missing
Territorial parks of Nunavut
Victoria Island (Canada)